I Am the Pretty Thing That Lives in the House is a 2016 gothic supernatural horror film written and directed by Osgood Perkins. It stars Ruth Wilson as a live-in nurse who suspects her elderly employer's house may be haunted, and also features Paula Prentiss in her first major film role in 30 years.

I Am the Pretty Thing That Lives in the House had premiered at the Toronto International Film Festival on September 10, 2016, and was released worldwide on Netflix on October 28. The film received mixed-to-positive reviews from critics, who praised its atmosphere and cinematography, but criticized its screenplay, slow pacing and failure to explain the plot.

Plot 
Iris Blum, a retired horror writer, suffers from dementia and lives in a remote house in Braintree, Massachusetts. The house was built by a man for his new bride, but the couple vanished on their wedding day and left the house unfurnished. Iris's estate manager, Mr. Waxcap, hires live-in nurse Lily Saylor to care for her. On Lily's first night in the house, the telephone is wrenched out of her hands by an unseen force. A figure in white walking backwards is seen. A spot of black mold appears on the wall and slowly grows as the months pass. Lily often finds a corner of the rug at the base of the stairs has been flipped up, but she is the only person in the house who walks on the first floor.

Iris only refers to Lily as "Polly," which Mr. Waxcap explains was the protagonist of her most popular novel, "The Lady in the Walls." Lily opens a copy of the book and finds that the novel implies that Iris knew Polly during her lifetime and is retelling her story. In 1812, Polly, wearing a wedding dress and black blindfold, walks through the empty house under the watchful eye of her husband.

In the kitchen, Lily briefly hallucinates that her arms have become bloated and covered in black mold spots. That evening, she spots the reflection of the figure dressed in white standing in the room but when she turns, no one is there. She discovers a moldy cardboard box hidden away in a closet. Inside are rough drafts for "The Lady in the Walls." She comes to believe that the novel may not be fictitious but rather depicts an actual murder committed in the house.

In 1812, the blindfolded Polly uses her hands to feel her surroundings, coming across a wall that has been stripped of its boards - the same section where mold is growing in present day. Polly raises her blindfold and sees the hole, locking eyes with her husband in confusion. Her husband suddenly bludgeons her to death with a hammer and hides her body behind the wall.

In the present, Lily tries to discuss the book with Iris. Iris angrily explains that Polly betrayed and abandoned her, and reminds her that even the prettiest of things eventually rot. Polly's ghost visits Iris, whispering in her ear. Investigating a mysterious sound, Lily finds the wall boards removed and piled beside the moldy wall. Turning, she sees what appears to be the ghost of Polly and dies from a heart attack.

Several days after, Mr. Waxcap discovers Lily's and Iris's bodies. Years later, a new family has moved into the house, watched over by Lily's ghost.

Cast 
 Ruth Wilson as Lily Saylor
 Paula Prentiss as Iris Blum
 Erin Boyes as young Iris
 Bob Balaban as Mr. Waxcap
 Lucy Boynton as Polly Parsons
 Brad Milne as Groom
 Daniel Chichagov as Darling
 James Perkins as John
 Beatrix Perkins as Wendy

Development 
Writer-director Osgood Perkins originally intended for the story to be about the daughter of a male horror novelist, but he said that "one day, it just changed".  Casting became easier once the film was financed; Perkins cited Wilson's talent and excitement for the project as two of the reasons she was chosen to play Lily.  Prentiss – a family friend who, as well as her husband Richard Benjamin, had performed with Perkins' father, Anthony Perkins – was the director's only choice to play Iris.

In a 2020 interview with director Mick Garris on Garris's podcast Post Mortem, Perkins revealed that the thematic nature of I Am the Pretty Thing That Lives in the House was intended to reflect Perkins’ own attempts at connecting with his deceased father, Anthony Perkins.

Release 
I Am the Pretty Thing That Lives in the House premiered at the Toronto International Film Festival on September 10, 2016.  It debuted on Netflix on October 28.

Reception 
Rotten Tomatoes, a review aggregator, reports that 60% of 20 surveyed critics gave the film a positive review; the average rating is 5.8/10. On Metacritic, the film has a score of 68 out of 100 based on 8 reviews, indicating "generally favorable reviews".

Dennis Harvey of Variety wrote that the film's atmosphere can not overcome its minimalist and familiar writing.  Stephen Dalton of The Hollywood Reporter called it "classy vintage horror with a literary flavor" and compared it to the works of David Lynch, Stanley Kubrick, and Roman Polanski. April Wolfe of The Village Voice described it as "the most atmospherically faithful adaptation ever of a Shirley Jackson book that never existed" and concluded that the film was "the very best of gothic horror." In rating it 2/5 stars, Nigel M. Smith of The Guardian wrote, "Osgood Perkins layers on the dread in his haunted house thriller. But as it becomes clear that there's no worthwhile story, the scares dissipate fast." A. A. Dowd of The A.V. Club called it a creepy, slow burn drama that works despite its lack of a conventional payoff.

References

External links 
 

2016 films
2016 horror films
2016 psychological thriller films
American psychological horror films
American independent films
American psychological thriller films
Films about health care
Films about writers
American ghost films
American haunted house films
English-language Netflix original films
Films directed by Oz Perkins
Films set in Massachusetts
American supernatural horror films
2010s English-language films
2010s American films